Evelyne Letourneur (born 13 September 1947) is a French former artistic gymnast. She competed at the 1964 and 1968 Summer Olympics.

References

1947 births
Living people
French female artistic gymnasts
Gymnasts at the 1964 Summer Olympics
Gymnasts at the 1968 Summer Olympics
Olympic gymnasts of France
Place of birth missing (living people)
20th-century French women